Peridinium willei is a species of  Dinoflagellata in the family Peridiniaceae.

It has been called perennial.

It is found in the United States, Sweden, Norway, Brazil, and the Netherlands.

P. willei lives in fresh water with one study saying it less likely occurs in lakes above 12 degrees or below 4 degrees.

References 

Peridiscaceae